The Ammodiscacea is a superfamily of foraminifera in the order Textulariida. tests (or shells) are made of agglutinated grains and consist of a proloculus (the initial chamber) followed by an enrolled tubular second chamber open at the distal end, that lacks internal septa but which may have growth constrictions.

Ammodiscacea includes a single family, the Ammodiscidae, which contains five subfamilies:
Ammodiscinae
Ammovertellininae
Ammovolummininae
Tolypammininae
Usbekistaniinae

References

 Alfred R. Loeblich Jr and Helen Tappan, 1964. Sarcodina Chiefly "Thecamoebians" and Foraminiferida; Treatise on Invertebrate Paleontology, Part C Protista 2. Geological Society of America and University of Kansas Press.
 Alfred R. Loeblich Jr and Helen Tappan, 1988. Forminiferal Genera and their Classification. E-book. Ammodiscacea

Foraminifera superfamilies
Globothalamea